Vanikoro cancellata is a species of very small sea snail, a marine gastropod mollusk in the family Vanikoridae.

Description

Distribution
 Aldabra
 Chagos
 Mozambique
 Tanzania

References

Vanikoridae
Gastropods described in 1822